Petrie is a surname.

Petrie may also refer to:

Places
 Antarctica
 Petrie Ice Rises, Alexander Island
 Australia
 Petrie, Queensland, a suburb of the Moreton Bay Region, Queensland
 Petrie Airfield
 Petrie railway station
 Division of Petrie, an electoral district in the Australian House of Representatives, in Queensland
 Mount Petrie, a mountain in Brisbane, Queensland
 Petrie Bight, a reach of the Brisbane River and neighbourhood within the Brisbane central business district
 Canada
 Petrie Island, Ontario
 Space
 Petrie (crater), on the Moon
 21476 Petrie, an asteroid

Given name
 Petrie Meston (1916-1963), Canadian politician
 Uncle Petrie, a fictional character in the American TV series Lassie
 Petrie (Pteranodon), a character in The Land Before Time series

Other uses
 Petrie Museum of Egyptian Archaeology, part of University College London
 Petrie baronets, a title in the Baronetage of the United Kingdom

See also
 Petrie of Rochdale, an English steam engine manufacturer founded in 1792
 Petri dish, a shallow lidded dish used by biologists, sometimes spelled "Petrie"